Omar Natami (born 15 December 1998) is an Italian professional footballer who plays as a midfielder or as a winger.

References

External links

1998 births
Living people
Italian footballers
Italian expatriate footballers
Association football midfielders
Luxembourg National Division players
Danish 1st Division players
F91 Dudelange players
US Mondorf-les-Bains players
Jeunesse Esch players
FC UNA Strassen players
Jammerbugt FC players
Italian expatriate sportspeople in Denmark
Expatriate men's footballers in Denmark